The silver-breasted broadbill (Serilophus lunatus) is a species of bird in the broadbill family, Eurylaimidae. It is monotypic (the only species) within the genus Serilophus. There are ten currently recognised subspecies, one of which, rubropygius, was formerly treated as a separate species.

It is found in Bangladesh, Bhutan, Cambodia, China, India, Indonesia, Laos, Malaysia, Myanmar, Nepal, Thailand, and Vietnam.
Its natural habitats are subtropical or tropical moist lowland forest and subtropical or tropical moist montane forest. The species has declined somewhat due to habitat loss, but is not considered to be threatened with extinction.

Description
The silver-breasted broadbill is a medium-sized broadbill,  in length and weighing . The plumage of the nominate race has a rusty-coloured head with an ash-grey forehead and a broad black supercilium (stripe) over the eye. The breast and belly is white and the rump and upper wing coverts are bright rufous. The flight feathers are striking blue and black and the tail is black. There is a small amount of sexual dimorphism in the plumage, with the female having a narrow silver band across the breast. Young birds resemble adults but with shorter wings and tails, and slightly darker plumage overall. There is also some variation across the different subspecies.

Food and feeding
The silver-breasted broadbill eats invertebrates, primarily insects : grasshoppers, mantises, caterpillars, larvae, small land snails. These insects are taken by flycatching from perch or by gleaning branches and foliage.

Habitat
The silver-breasted broadbill occupies a range of forest habitats. It occurs in tropical and semi-tropical forests, as well as semi-deciduous forests and forests dominated by pine, oak and bamboo. It may occur in selectively logged forests and even entered agricultural land and gardens.

References

External links

silver-breasted broadbill
Birds of Southeast Asia
Birds of Hainan
Birds of Northeast India
Birds of Yunnan
silver-breasted broadbill
Taxonomy articles created by Polbot